FC Lokomotiv Liski is a Russian association football club from Liski, founded in 1936. It first played on the professional league level in 1995. The highest level it achieved was the third-tier Russian Professional Football League, where it played from 2009 to 2015–16. It dropped out of professional-level competitions before the 2016–17 season.

References

External links

Association football clubs established in 1936
Football clubs in Russia
Liski
Sport in Voronezh Oblast
1936 establishments in Russia